María Noel Genovese Berisso (born 25 December 1943, in Montevideo), better known for her stage name María Noel, is a former Uruguayan model and actress.

In 1962 she took part in Miss Uruguay and Miss World, where she was a runner-up. Afterwards she developed a career as model and actress in Argentina and USA.

Television
 Los cinco sentidos (1963)
 It Takes a Thief (1969)
 Hupumorpo (1974)
 Mi hermano Javier (1977)
 Mancinelli y familia (1980)
 Verónica: el rostro del amor (1982)

Filmography
 La flor de la mafia (1974)
 La noche del hurto (1977)
 Tiempos duros para Drácula (1977)
 Los superagentes biónicos (1977)
 Cuatro pícaros bomberos (1979)
 A Hole in the Wall (1982)
 The Tango Lesson (1997)

References

External links
 
 Blog about María Noel 
 Another blog about María Noel with press excerpts 
 María Noel at Facebook 
 María Noel at Cinenacional.com 

1943 births
Actresses from Montevideo
Uruguayan expatriate actresses in Argentina
Uruguayan female models
20th-century Uruguayan actresses
Living people
Miss World 1962 delegates
Uruguayan film actresses
Uruguayan television actresses